Herwigia kreffti, Krefft's smooth-head, is a species of bathylaconid fish found at depths of  in the oceans.  This species grows to a length of  SL.  This species is the only recognized species in its genus.

References

Alepocephalidae
Monotypic fish genera
Fish described in 1970